AOPEN (stylized AOPEN) is a major electronics manufacturer from Taiwan that makes computers and parts for computers. AOPEN used to be the Open System Business Unit of Acer Computer Inc. which designed, manufactured and sold computer components.

It was incorporated in December 1996 as a subsidiary of Acer Group with an initial public offering (IPO) at the Taiwan stock exchange in August 2002. It is also the first subsidiary that established the entrepreneurship paradigm in the pan-Acer Group. At that time, AOPENs major shareholder was the Wistron Group. In 2018 AOPEN became a partner of the pan-Acer Group again as the business-to-business branch of the computing industry. 

They are perhaps most well known for their "Mobile on Desktop" (MoDT), which implements Intel's Pentium M platform on desktop motherboards. Because the Pentium 4 and other NetBurst CPUs proved less energy efficient than the Pentium M, in late 2004 and early 2005, many manufacturers introduced desktop motherboards for the mobile Pentium M, AOPEN being one of the first.

AOPEN currently specializes in ultra small form factor (uSFF) platform applications; digital signage; and product development and designs characterized by miniaturization, standardization and modularization.

Product position and strategies
Since 2005 AOPEN has been developing energy-saving products. According to different types of customers, applications and contexts, AOPEN splits its product platforms into two major categories: media player platform and Panel PC platform, both of which have Windows, Linux, ChromeOS and Android devices.

Digital Signage Platform
There are six major parts in AOPEN's digital signage platform applications: media player, management, deployment, display, extension and software. AOPEN manufacturers the digital signage media players with operating system and pre-imaging. This also includes a remote management option.

See also
 List of companies of Taiwan

References

Taiwanese companies established in 1996
Companies based in Taipei
Electronics companies established in 1996
Companies listed on the Taiwan Stock Exchange
Electronics companies of Taiwan
Motherboard companies
Taiwanese brands

External links